Brent Franklin Nelsen is an American political science professor at Furman University in Greenville, South Carolina. He served as chair of the South Carolina Educational Television Commission, having been appointed to the position by South Carolina governor Nikki Haley in 2011. He was reappointed to an additional six-year term in 2014. He resigned from the Commission in 2019.

In 2010 he was a Republican candidate for the position of South Carolina State Superintendent of Education. On Thursday, April 25, 2013, U.S. President Barack Obama nominated him for confirmation by the U.S. Senate to be a member of the board of directors of the U.S. Corporation for Public Broadcasting, for a term expiring Sunday, January 31, 2016, replacing Gay Hart Gaines, whose term expired. He was confirmed by the Senate on August 1, 2013. He serves on the board as the chair of the Spectrum Committee, which oversees CPB Board activity regarding the FCC's auction of television broadcast spectrum.

Nelsen completed his undergraduate study at Wheaton College and then pursued a master's and doctorate of political science at the University of Wisconsin–Madison. He has taught political science at Furman University in Greenville, South Carolina, since 1989. He was chair of the Furman Department of Political Science from 2003 to 2009. Nelsen also served as president of the South Carolina Political Science Association from 2009 to 2010 and president of Christians in Political Science from 2004 to 2006. His scholarship focuses on the European Union, especially the role of religion in the formation of attitudes toward European integration.

He is married to Lori Nelsen and has three children and two grandchildren. Nelsen was a founding member of Redeemer Presbyterian Church in Greenville, South Carolina.

Bibliography
Religion and the Struggle for European Union: Confessional Culture and the Limits of Integration, with James L. Guth (Georgetown University Press, 2015).
The European Union: Readings on the Theory and Practice of European Integration, eds. Brent F. Nelsen and Alexander C-G. Stubb (Boulder, Col.: Lynne Rienner Publishers). Fourth Edition, 2014.
Norway and the European Community: The Political Economy of Integration, ed. Brent F. Nelsen (Westport, CT: Praeger Publishers, 1993).
The State Offshore: Petroleum, Politics, and State Intervention on the British and Norwegian Continental Shelves (New York: Praeger Publishers, 1991).

References

 University of Wisconsin–Madison College of Letters and Science alumni
Furman University faculty
Living people
Wheaton College (Illinois) alumni
1959 births
American political scientists
People from Grand Haven, Michigan